Olga Vladislavovna Orlova (born 2 September 1986) is a Russian former competitive ice dancer. With Maxim Bolotin, she won three silver medals on the Junior Grand Prix and qualified for the 2003-2004 Junior Grand Prix Final. When that partnership ended, she teamed up with Anton Saulin for one season and then Vitali Novikov, with whom she placed sixth at the 2005 Cup of Russia.

In 2009, she teamed up with Matthieu Jost to compete for France. They are the 2010 French bronze medalists. They did not compete internationally.

Programs

With Novikov

With Bolotin

Competitive highlights 
GP: Grand Prix; JGP: Junior Grand Prix

With Jost for France

With Novikov for Russia

With Saulin for Russia

With Bolotin for Russia

With Maximishin for Russia

References

External links 

 
 
 
 

Russian female ice dancers
Figure skaters from Moscow
1986 births
Living people